Beni Ḥassan ( "Children of Ḥassān") is a nomadic group of Arabian origin, one of the four sub-tribes of the Maqil Arab tribes who emigrated in the 10th century to the Maghreb with the Bani Hilal and Banu Sulaym tribes.

In Morocco, they first settled, alongside their Maqil relatives, in the area between Tadla and the Moulouya River. The Sous Almohad governor called upon them for help against a rebellion in the Sous, and they resettled in and around that region.

They later moved to Mauritania, and from the 16th century onwards, they managed to push back all black Mauritanians southwards to the Senegal Valley river. The Beni Hassan and other warrior Arab tribes dominated the Sanhaja Berber tribes of the area after the Char Bouba war of the 17th century. As a result, Arabian culture and language came to dominate, and the Berber tribes underwent some Arabisation. The Bani Hassan dialect of Arabic became used in the region and is still spoken, in the form of Hassaniya Arabic.

The hierarchy established by the Beni Hassan tribe gave Mauritania much of its sociological character. That ideology has led to oppression, discrimination and even enslavement of other groups in Mauritania.

Beni Hassan sub-tribes 
The descendants of Hasan ben Mokhtar ben Mohamed, son of the forefather of the Maqils
The Shebanat: descendants of Shebana, brother of Hassan, and son of Mokhtar ben Mohamed
The Reguitat: descendants of Jallal, Salem and Uthman, brothers of Mokhtar and sons of Mohamed

Several other Arab tribes joined the Maqils and became part of the Beni Hassan tribe.

See also
Maqil
Banu Sulaym
Banu Hilal
Char Bouba war
North African Arabs

References

 Almsaodi, Abdulaziz. Modern History of Yemen
 Power and Interest News Report

Arab tribes in Mauritania
Arab tribes in Western Sahara
Arab tribes in Morocco
Tribes of Saudi Arabia
Sahrawi tribes